Nasa Parqu (Aymara nasa nose, parqu something twisted, "twisted nose", Hispanicized spelling Nazaparco) is a  mountain in the Andes of southern Peru. It is situated in the Tacna Region, Candarave Province, Candarave District. Nasa Parqu lies northwest of the volcano Yukamani and southwest of the mountain Ch'iyar Jaqhi.

References

Mountains of Tacna Region
Mountains of Peru